SM UB-31 was a German Type UB II submarine or U-boat in the German Imperial Navy during World War I. The U-boat was ordered on 22 July 1915 and launched on 16 November 1915. She was commissioned into the German Imperial Navy on 25 March 1916 as SM UB-31.

The submarine sank 27 ships in 25 patrols. Alternatively she may have been sunk by a mine on that date.

Design
A German Type UB II submarine, UB-31 had a displacement of  when at the surface and  while submerged. The submarine was powered by two Benz six-cylinder diesel engines producing a total , two Siemens-Schuckert electric motors producing , and one propeller shaft.

UB-31 was fitted with two  torpedo tubes, four torpedoes, and one  Uk L/30 deck gun. She had a complement of twenty-one crew members and two officers and a 42-second dive time.

Summary of raiding history

References

Notes

Citations

Bibliography

External links
 Croche, Paulo (2014) 'UB-31 Folkestone, Kent: Archaeological Report', Wessex Archaeology
 Historic England project to research First World War submarine wrecks. 

1915 ships
Ships built in Hamburg
World War I submarines of Germany
German Type UB II submarines
U-boats commissioned in 1916
Maritime incidents in 1918
U-boats sunk in 1918
U-boats sunk by depth charges
U-boats sunk by British warships
World War I shipwrecks in the English Channel
Ships lost with all hands
Protected Wrecks of the United Kingdom